Prestige Hong Kong is a monthly luxury-lifestyle magazine headquartered in Hong Kong by Burda Luxury, a subsidiary of Hubert Burda Media. It publishes English-language articles and interviews on fashion, celebrities, culture, high society, watches and jewellery, lifestyle, wealth and real estate, wine and dining, and motoring.

Content 
The magazine, which has editions in several Asian countries, began publishing its Hong Kong edition in 2005. Alongside Hong Kong personalities it often features exclusive interviews with international celebrities. In addition to the main book, Prestige Hong Kong contains seasonal supplements with in-depth coverage on fashion, jewellery, watches, health and beauty, dining, property and wealth.

In September 2008, Prestige Hong Kong published an 808-page special birthday issue, its largest and heaviest edition, weighing in at more than 3 kg. In September 2010, the magazine produced a dual cover edition featuring Kim Kardashian. One of the covers showed Kardashian flanked by two naked male models.

Prestige Online
Prestige Online is the online web portal of the Prestige brand providing a similar range of luxury-lifestyle content. It is operated by Burda International Asia.

References

Magazines published in Hong Kong
Magazines established in 2005
Monthly magazines
Lifestyle magazines
Fashion magazines
2005 establishments in Hong Kong